The national symbols of Nigeria are official and unofficial flags, icons or cultural expressions that are emblematic, representative or otherwise characteristic of Nigeria and of its culture.

Symbol

References 

National symbols of Nigeria